Outrigger canoeing at the 1995 South Pacific Games in Tahiti. Events were contested in the Va'a rudderless canoe. Tahiti dominated the competition winning all eight gold medals.

Medal summary

Medal table

Men's Results

Women's Results

Participating countries
Countries entered in the outrigger canoeing events at the 1995 Games included:

References

Outrigger canoeing at the Pacific Games
1995 Pacific Games
Pacific Games